This is a list of common Latin abbreviations. Nearly all the abbreviations below have been adopted by Modern English. However, with some exceptions (for example, versus or modus operandi), most of the Latin referent words and phrases are perceived as foreign to English. In a few cases, English referents have replaced the original Latin ones (e.g., "rest in peace" for RIP and "postscript" for PS).

Latin was once the universal academic language in Europe. From the 18th century, authors started using their mother tongues to write books, papers or proceedings. Even when Latin fell out of use, many Latin abbreviations continued to be used due to their precise simplicity and Latin's status as a learned language.

List of common abbreviations 

All abbreviations are given with full stops, although, in most situations, these are omitted or included as a personal preference.

List of less common abbreviations and usages 

Words and abbreviations that have been in general use but are currently used less often.

Used in biology 

 aff. (affinis): having affinity with, similar but not identical to
 auct. (auctorum): of the authors; indicates that a name is used in the sense of subsequent authors, and not in the sense of the original author
 Ca. (Candidatus): for candidate names of organisms that have not been completely accepted
 ex. (exemplar): example or specimen; plural abbreviated as exx.
 f. sp. (forma specialis): a special form adapted to a specific host; plural abbreviated as ff. spp.
 in coll. (in collectionem): in the collection, often followed by the name of a collection or museum
 indet. (indeterminans): undetermined, unidentified
 leg. (legit): he/she collected, often followed by the name of the collector
 nob. (nobis): by us, used to indicate that the writer(s) are the author(s) of a scientific name
 sensu: "in the sense of", used for different groups of organisms
 sp. (species): species (singular); plural also species, abbreviated as spp.
 sp. nov. (species nova): new species (singular); plural is species novae, abbreviated as spp. nov.
 ssp., subsp. (subspecies): subspecies (singular); plural is subspecies, abbreviated sspp. or subspp.

See also 

 Glossary of scientific naming § Latin abbreviations
 List of abbreviations used in medical prescriptions
 List of classical abbreviations
 List of ecclesiastical abbreviations
 List of Latin phrases
 Scribal abbreviation

References

Bibliography

External links 

Lists of phrases
Latin
Abbreviations